"The Real Slim Shady" is a song by American rapper Eminem from his third album The Marshall Mathers LP (2000). It was released as the lead single a month before the album's release.

"The Real Slim Shady" was Eminem's first song to reach number one in the UK and it also peaked at number four on the Billboard Hot 100, giving him his biggest hit up to that point. The song was the 14th best selling of 2000 in the UK. It won multiple awards, including MTV Video Music Awards for Best Video and Best Male Video, as well as a Grammy Award for Best Rap Solo Performance.  In October 2011, NME placed it at number 80 on its list "150 Best Tracks of the Past 15 Years". It was listed at number 396 on NMEs 500 greatest songs of all time.

Premise

"The Real Slim Shady" was not originally intended to be part of The Marshall Mathers LP. Interscope Records's Jimmy Iovine wanted Eminem to have a song to introduce the album, similar to the way "My Name Is" was the first single on The Slim Shady LP. Eminem, Dr. Dre, Tommy Coster and Mike Elizondo wrote "The Real Slim Shady" just hours before the final copy of the album was due. The first single was intended to be "Who Knew."

Critical reception

PopMatters described this song: "In a number of songs on the new album, including the current single, 'The Real Slim Shady,' Eminem slams his 'enemies' with comic book intensity. In the video, he wears a superhero costume and an insane asylum straitjacket while rapping, 'I'm sick of you little girl and boy groups, all you do is annoy me / So I have been sent here to destroy you / And there's a million of us just like me / Who cuss like me; who just don't give a fuck like me / Who dress like me; walk, talk and act like me / And just might be the next best thing, but not quite me!' Of course, the irony is built into the song: Eminem's signature style the bleached blond hair, pale skin, humungous T-shirt has spawned droves of lookalikes and wannabes. Voila, he's a teen idol. Poor Em, can't win for losing."

Allmusic highlighted the single.

Will Hermes was positive: "In the aftermath of Slim Shady, he married the girlfriend he imagined killing, while his mother, immortalized in his hit single 'My Name Is' (I just found out my Mom does more dope than I do), sued him for $10 million for defamation of character." The defamation case was settled in 2001 for $25,000 as Debbie Mathers' former attorney was awarded $23,354—netting Ms. Mathers just over $1600 for her efforts.

LA Times wrote: "'The Real Slim Shady,' the first single from the album, is a modest step to the mainstream—a fresh and funny, almost PG-rated swipe at everything from the Grammy Awards to shallow teen pop."

IGN cited: "The album's obligatory 'pop' number is exposed on 'The Real Slim Shady,' which chugs and lurches along to a boinging electro funk beat. It would be a total pop smash if it weren't for the lyrics, though. Leave it to Em to juice it up with ear candy effervescent, but keep the words in the subversive. As with the other Dre crafted tunes on the album, there's plenty of cool special effects bustling about—fart noises, heavy breathing, all of it coalescing with Em's cartoon character on crystal meth delivery. Sure it's pop, but of the most demented nature."

Rolling Stone praised the sound of the single as "slick, bright, melodic funk that's so R&B-ish, you can dance to it".

The song has been in many films, notably 21 Jump Street (2012) and Freddy Got Fingered (2001).

Music video
Actress and comedian Kathy Griffin, notable for insulting celebrities in her act, appears in the video as an attending nurse in a psychiatric ward. Griffin said during a July 21, 2005, interview on The Tonight Show with Jay Leno that Eminem selected her for the video because fellow rapper Snoop Dogg told him she was "really funny."

Credits
Information from the interior booklet of The Marshall Mathers LP
 Singing and Lyrics: Eminem
 Production: Dr. Dre And Mel-Man
 Mixing: Dr. Dre
 Bass Guitar – Mike Elizondo
 Keyboards – Tommy Coster
 Editing – Dan Lebental
 Executive-Producer – Dr. Dre
 Composer – Andre Young, Marshall Mathers, Tommy Coster

Awards

"The Real Slim Shady" was very successful at the 2000 MTV Video Music Awards, winning awards for Video of the Year and Best Male Video, as well as being a nominee for Best Rap Video, Best Direction, Best Editing and Viewer's Choice. The song was also performed by Eminem at the show with look-a-likes of himself, as in the video.

Track listing

Charts

Weekly charts

Year-end charts

Certifications

See also
Grammy Award for Best Rap Solo Performance
List of artists who reached number one on the U.S. Rhythmic chart
List of number-one singles of 2000 (Ireland)
List of European number-one hits of 2000
List of UK Singles Chart number ones of the 2000s

References

External links

Eminem songs
2000 singles
UK Singles Chart number-one singles
European Hot 100 Singles number-one singles
Grammy Award for Best Rap Solo Performance
Irish Singles Chart number-one singles
Number-one singles in Iceland
Number-one singles in Scotland
MTV Video of the Year Award
MTV Video Music Award for Best Male Video
Songs about domestic violence
Songs about the media
Songs about hip hop
Songs about musicians
Songs written by Eminem
Songs written by Dr. Dre
Songs written by Mike Elizondo
Song recordings produced by Dr. Dre
Song recordings produced by Mel-Man
Shady Records singles
Aftermath Entertainment singles
Interscope Records singles
Cultural depictions of Britney Spears
American hip hop songs
Comedy rap songs
Hardcore hip hop songs
2000 songs
Obscenity controversies in music
Songs about fictional male characters